is a co-educational, Christian, private university in Japan. The main campus is located in Ōtaki, Chiba, Japan. The college is a part of the world-wide network of Seventh-day Adventist (SDA) institutions of higher education, the world's second largest Christian school system.

History 

The history of the college began in 1898 when William C. Grainger, an SDA missionary, founded  in Azabu, Tokyo. In 1914 the school was moved to Suginami and renamed Amanuma Gakuin. In 1926 the school was moved to Sodegaura, Chiba and renamed Nihon San’iku Gakuin.

In 1943, during World War II, the school was forcibly closed. The school was resumed in 1947 after the war. In 1971 the school foundation established Saniku Gakuin Junior College with one department (Department of English Language). In 1978 the college was moved to the present Otaki Campus. In 1987 the college added the Department of Nursing, which became a four-year college in 2008.

Organization 
As of April 2012, the university has no graduate schools.

Undergraduate schools 
 Faculty of Nursing

The students study at Otaki Campus during their first 2.5 years, then move to the Tokyo Campus next to the Tokyo Adventist Hospital in Suginami. After a one-year clinical study in Tokyo, they move to Otaki Campus again.

Affiliated schools 
 Saniku Gakuin Junior College
 Department of English Communications
 Saniku Gakuin College (technical college)
 Department of Theology
 Department of Christian Education

See also

 List of Seventh-day Adventist colleges and universities
 Seventh-day Adventist education

References

External links 

  

Universities and colleges affiliated with the Seventh-day Adventist Church
Private universities and colleges in Japan
Universities and colleges in Chiba Prefecture